Anthony Steffen, born Antonio Luiz de Teffé von Hoonholtz (July 21, 1930 – June 4, 2004), was an Italian-Brazilian character actor, screenwriter and film producer. Steffen achieved fame as a leading man in Spaghetti Western features. He was also known as Antonio Luigi de Teffe.

Biography
Born Antonio Luiz de Teffé von Hoonholtz at the Brazilian embassy in Rome, in the Pamphilj Palace, his family had noble blood of a long lineage of Count (von Hoonholtz) originally from Prussia; his great grandfather was the Great Baron of Teffé. Steffen was the first born among Manoel de Teffe' von Hoonholtz's children (followed by Federico de Teffe' and Melissa de Teffe'), who was a Formula One racing champion and later a Brazilian Ambassador. Steffen's grandaunt was Nair de Teffé von Hoonholtz, the first female caricaturist of Brazil, wife of Brazilian President Hermes Fonseca and daughter of the Admiral Antonio Luis von Hoonholtz.

While still a teenager Steffen, then known as Antonio, fought in World War II among the Italian partisans against the Nazis.

Later, and under the name Antonio de Teffé, he worked behind the scenes in several Italian productions in the early 1950s and later acted in several movies, but never really achieving stardom. In 1962, he had a bit part in Sodom and Gomorrah. An early appearance of his was in the 1955 Gli Sbandati.

From 1965 to 1975, the newly named Anthony Steffen achieved considerable fame in Europe, amassing cult status, starring in 27 Spaghetti Westerns. Considered to be an "Italian Clint Eastwood", he was sometimes unfairly criticized for being a stiff or wooden actor. Several of his movies were sizeable box office hits in Europe.

Django the Bastard (aka Stranger's Gundown, 1969) a movie that was produced and written by Steffen, is considered to be an inspiration for Clint Eastwood's High Plains Drifter. In several of his movies, Steffen starred alongside other actors known for Spaghetti Westerns, including Gianni Garko, Peter Lee Lawrence, and William Berger. Outside of the Spaghetti western genre, Steffen also appeared in several Giallo movies including The Night Evelyn Came Out of the Grave (1971). His roles and status diminished as the Spaghetti Western genre fell into decline. Amassing a considerable fortune from his career as an actor, Steffen embarked on a jet set lifestyle.

In his career Steffen performed alongside Sophia Loren, Gina Lollobrigida, Claudia Cardinale, Elke Sommer, Giuliano Gemma, Franco Nero, Gian Maria Volonté, Esmeralda Barros and many other stars of the American and Italian cinema.

Always considered a huge star in Brazil because of the Spaghetti Western popularity in the South American country, Steffen returned to Rio de Janeiro, Brazil in the decade of 1980, until dying of cancer in 2004. He has maintained cult-status among fans of Italian Cinema for being perhaps the most prolific Spaghetti Western Leading actor.

Selected filmography
Ci troviamo in galleria (1953)
The Abandoned (1955) - Carlo
Eighteen Year Olds (1955) - Professore Andrea La Rovere
Beatrice Cenci (1956) - Giacomo Cenci
La trovatella di Pompei (1957) - Giorgio della Torre
Città di notte (1958) - Alberto
Slave Women of Corinth (1958) - Demetrio
The Devil's Cavaliers (1959) - Richmond
Ragazzi del Juke-Box (1959) - Paolo Macelloni
Il carro armato dell'8 settembre (1960)
Cavalcata selvaggia (1960)
Solitudine (1961)
Ultimatum alla vita (1962) - Lt. Krüger
Sodom and Gomorrah (1962) - The Captain
Avventura al motel (1963) - Maurizio
Revenge of the Black Knight (1963) - Dottore George Welby
The Invincible Brothers Maciste (1964) - Prince Akim
 The Last Tomahawk (1965) - Falkenauge
I figli del leopardo (1965) - Tenente Garibaldino
Gli amanti latini (1965) - (uncredited)
Perché uccidi ancora (1965) - Steve McDougall
A Coffin for the Sheriff (1965) - Sheriff Joe Logan / Shenandoah
Seven Dollars on the Red (1966) - Johnny Ashley
An Angel for Satan (1966) - Roberto Merigi
Los cuatro salvajes (1966) - Ringo
A Few Dollars for Django (1966) - Django / Regan
Blood at Sundown (1966) - Johnny Liston
Gentlemen Kiler (1967) - Gentleman Jo Reeves / Shamango
Killer Kid (1967) - Captain Morrison / Chamaco
Train for Durango (1968) - Gringo
Gunman Sent by God (1968) - Roy Kerry
A Stranger in Paso Bravo (1968) - Gary Hamilton
Man Who Cried for Revenge (1968) - Davy Flanagan
Dead Men Don't Count (1968) - Fred Danton
A Noose for Django (1969) - Johnny Brandon
Garringo (1969) - Lt. Garringo
Django the Bastard (1969) - Django
Shango (1970) - Shango
Arizona Colt Returns (1970) - Arizona Colt
Sabata the Killer (1970) - Sabata / Garringo
Apocalypse Joe (1970) - Joe Clifford
The Night Evelyn Came Out of the Grave (1971) - Lord Alan Cunningham
Viva! Django (1971) - Django
Crimes of the Black Cat (1972) - Peter Oliver
They Believed He Was No Saint (1972) - Trash Benson
Al tropico del cancro (1972) - Doctor Williams
The Killer with a Thousand Eyes (1973) - Inspector Michael Lawrence
Fuzzy the Hero (1973) - Shoshena
Sedici anni (1973) - Sergio / Mara's lover
Il mio nome è Scopone e faccio sempre cappotto (1974) - Dallas
Charlotte (1974) - Le Prince Sforza
Siete chacales (1974)
The Killers Are Our Guests (1974) - Dr. Guido Malerva
Evil Eye (1975) - Inspector Ranieri
La encadenada (1975) - Richard
Rome: The Other Side of Violence (1976) - Dr. Alessi
Zoo zéro (1979) - Evariste, le commissaire
Killer Fish (1979) - Max
Play Motel (1979) - De Sanctis
Femmine infernali (1980) - Doctor Farrell
Lady Dynamite (1980) - Nico Barresi
Orinoco: Prigioniere del sesso (1980) - Juan Laredo
Mulheres Liberadas (1982)
Momentos de Prazer e Agonia (1983) - Rodolfo
Abatjour 2 (1990)
Malù e l'amante (1991) - Frans / Il Conte / husband (final film role)

References

External links

 
 The Films of Anthony Steffen
 Shobary Profile

1930 births
2004 deaths
Brazilian male film actors
Brazilian people of German descent
Male Spaghetti Western actors
Italian emigrants to Brazil
Italian male film actors
20th-century Italian screenwriters
Italian male screenwriters
Italian film producers
Deaths from cancer in Rio de Janeiro (state)
Film people from Rome
Male actors from Rome
20th-century Italian male writers